Iyankerny Tamil Grama Niladhari Division is a Grama Niladhari Division of the Eravur Pattu Divisional Secretariat of Batticaloa District of Eastern Province, Sri Lanka. It has Grama Niladhari Division Code 193C.

Iyankerny Tamil is a surrounded by the Chenkalady 1, Thalavai, Iyankerny Muslim, Eravur 03, Ellainagar, Chenkalady 2, Kommathurai East, Kommathurai North and Kaluvankerny 2 Grama Niladhari Divisions.

Demographics

Ethnicity 

The Iyankerny Tamil Grama Niladhari Division has a Sri Lankan Tamil majority (92.4%). In comparison, the Eravur Pattu Divisional Secretariat (which contains the Iyankerny Tamil Grama Niladhari Division) has a Sri Lankan Tamil majority (80.0%) and a significant Moor population (16.8%)

Religion 

The Iyankerny Tamil Grama Niladhari Division has a Hindu majority (74.8%) and a significant Other Christian population (14.6%). In comparison, the Eravur Pattu Divisional Secretariat (which contains the Iyankerny Tamil Grama Niladhari Division) has a Hindu majority (71.3%) and a significant Muslim population (16.8%)

References 

Grama Niladhari Divisions of Eravur Pattu Divisional Secretariat